Dr. Deorao Madguji Holi is a member of the 13th Maharashtra Legislative Assembly. He represents the Gadchiroli Assembly Constituency. He belongs to the Bharatiya Janata Party. He is a medical doctor. The second doctor elected from this constituency, reserved for a Scheduled Tribe candidate, after Saguna Talandi in 2009. His 2014 victory is amongst Vidarbha's top ten in terms of margin.

Controversy
His election has been challenged in the Bombay High Court by one of the losing candidates Narayanrao Jambhule of the All India Forward Bloc, on the grounds that Holi indulged in irregularities in his capacity as medical officer of Gadchiroli Zilla Parishad.

References

Maharashtra MLAs 2014–2019
Bharatiya Janata Party politicians from Maharashtra
Living people
People from Gadchiroli
Marathi politicians
1970 births